Flick is a campy British horror film written and directed by David Howard, and starring Hugh O'Conor and Faye Dunaway. It had its theatrical release in 2008, and the DVD of the film was released in the United Kingdom on 19 October 2009. The film was shot in Wales, in and around Cardiff, Pontypool, Newbridge (Caerphilly) and Briton Ferry.

Plot
Memphis cop Lieutenant McKenzie is called in to investigate a series of strange deaths and weird sightings following the resurrection of a murder victim, a local boy named Johnny 'Flick' Taylor (Hugh O'Conor) from the 1950s, who is brought back to life in modern times and tries to find his teenage sweetheart named Sally who is now aged 62 and also to seek revenge for his death.

Cast

References

External links
 
 

2008 films
British horror films
British zombie films
2008 horror films
Films shot in Wales
2000s English-language films
2000s British films